Micrandreae is a tribe of the subfamily Crotonoideae, under the family Euphorbiaceae. It comprises 2 subtribes and 4 genera.

Genera
 Subtribe Heveinae
 Hevea Aubl.
 Subtribe Micrandrinae
 Cunuria Baill.
 Micrandra Benth.
 Micrandropsis W.A.Rodrigues

See also
 Taxonomy of the Euphorbiaceae

References

External links
 
 

Crotonoideae
Euphorbiaceae tribes